Souderton Area School District is a large, suburban public school district which covers an area of almost  in the Montgomery County and Bucks County suburbs of Philadelphia. The district serves the municipalities of Souderton, Telford, Franconia, Lower Salford, Upper Salford, and Salford. By 2010, the population of the district had exceeded 43,109.  The Souderton Area School District operates 3 secondary schools and 6 elementary schools. A new high school was built on Lower Road and was occupied in  September 2009.

The teachers union for the Souderton Area School District went on strike on Tuesday, September 2, 2008. The dispute was over wages and health-care benefits, among other things. The strike ended September 25, 2008 with the Teachers' Union's acceptance of a nonbinding arbitration report proposed by the Souderton Area School Board.

Schools

Secondary
Souderton Area High School
Indian Crest Middle School
Indian Valley Middle School

Elementary
 E. Merton Crouthamel (EMC)
 Franconia
 Lower Salford (closed in June 2013)
 Oak Ridge
 Salford Hills
 Vernfield
 West Broad Street

Academic achievement
Souderton Area School District was ranked 51st out of 498 Pennsylvania school districts in 2012 by the Pittsburgh Business Times. The ranking was based on five years of student academic performance on the PSSAs for: reading, writing, math and three years of science.

2011 - 46th
2010 - 40th
2009 - 40th
2008 - 49th
2007 - 54th out of 501 Pennsylvania school districts.

In 2009, the academic achievement, of the students in the Souderton Area School District, was in the 91st percentile among all 500 Pennsylvania school districts Scale (0–99; 100 is state best)

Graduation rate
In 2011, the graduation rate was 98.7%. In 2010, the Pennsylvania Department of Education issued a new, 4-year cohort graduation rate. Souderton Area School District's rate was 94% for 2010.

Under former calculation formula:
 2010 - 96% 
 2009 - 96% 
 2008 - 95%
 2007 - 97%

High school
In 2011 the school achieves AYP status. In 2010 the school was in  Making Progress: School Improvement Level II due to chronic, low student achievement.

11th Grade Reading
2011 - 88.2% on grade level (% below basic). State - 69.1% of 11th graders are on grade level.
2010 - 82.1% on grade level (6.4% below basic). In Pennsylvania, 66% of 11th graders are on grade level.
2009 - 80.1%  (8.3% below basic), State - 65% 
2008 - 82.1% (7.5% below basic), State - 65% 

11th Grade Math:
2011 - 85.6% on grade level (4.7% below basic). In Pennsylvania, 60.3% of 11th graders are on grade level.
2010 - 83.9% (5.9% below basic). State - 59%  
2009 - 73.2% (11.2% below basic). State - 56%.
2008 - 74.5% (11.6% below basic), State - 56%

11th Grade Science:
2011 - 67.1% on grade level (4.5% below basic). State - 40% of 11th graders were on grade level.
2010 - 54.3% (9.5% below basic). State - 39% 
2009 - 66.1% (4.5% below basic). State - 40% 
2008 - 55% (8% below basic).  State - 39%

School Board 
Souderton Area School District is governed by a 9 member board of School Directors. School Directors serve 4-year terms.

 Ken R. Keith, President
 Stephen Nelson, Vice President
 Courtney Barbieri
 Nicholas A. Braccio
 William J. Brong
 Janet Flisak
 Andrew Landis
 Thomas A. Kwiatkowski
 Donna M. Scheuren

References

School districts in Montgomery County, Pennsylvania